The Do Not Disturb or (DND) function on most PBX or PABX systems prevents calls from ringing on an extension for which DND is activated.  Some Do Not Disturb (DND) attributes include directing the call to a preassigned extension (like a secretary or assistant), busy signal, DND signal, or recorded message generated by the telephone switch.  Some switches allow the call to go through to the extension but restrict the response to a visual indication.  Some PBX systems allow the assignment of DND circumvention codes to supervisors.

The implementation of this feature is vendor-specific. In some cases, the ringer just does not ring and the called party is thus not alerted. Usually, though, the phone just acts as being busy. Depending on the infrastructure, the caller may end up on the called party's voice mailbox, sometimes after a certain delay.

Some special configurations combine DND with other features like call forwarding, where calls to a party with DND on are forwarded to another phone.

References
Mitel 3300 Integrated Communications Platform (page 15)
U.S. Patent 3651270: Message waiting and do-not-disturb arrangement

Calling features

fr:Autocommutateur téléphonique privé#Ne pas déranger